Seuilly is a commune in the Indre-et-Loire department in central France.

Population

Sights
La Devinière, in Seuilly, houses a museum dedicated to François Rabelais, and is claimed to be the writer's birthplace.

See also
Communes of the Indre-et-Loire department

References

Communes of Indre-et-Loire